CD11c, also known as Integrin, alpha X (complement component 3 receptor 4 subunit) (ITGAX), is a gene that encodes for CD11c  .

CD11c is an integrin alpha X chain protein. Integrins are heterodimeric integral membrane proteins composed of an alpha chain and a beta chain. This protein combines with the beta 2 chain (ITGB2) to form a leukocyte-specific integrin referred to as inactivated-C3b (iC3b) receptor 4 (CR4). The alpha X beta 2 complex seems to overlap the properties of the alpha M beta 2 integrin in the adherence of neutrophils and monocytes to stimulated endothelium cells, and in the phagocytosis of complement coated particles.

CD11c is a type I transmembrane protein found at high levels on most human dendritic cells, but also on monocytes, macrophages, neutrophils, and some B cells that induces cellular activation and helps trigger neutrophil respiratory burst; expressed in hairy cell leukemias, acute nonlymphocytic leukemias, and some B-cell chronic lymphocytic leukemias.

See also
 Integrin

References

Further reading

External links
 
 Mouse CD Antigen Chart
 Human CD Antigen Chart
ITGAX Info with links in the Cell Migration Gateway 
 
 

Integrins
Clusters of differentiation